Bludger may refer to:

Bludger (fish), a tropical to subtropical fish
Bludger (Quidditch), a type of ball used in the game Quidditch in the fictional Harry Potter universe
Bludger, Australian slang for a lazy person